The 1992–93 Club América season is the club's 48th consecutive season in the top-flight of Mexican football. The team competed in the Liga MX and the CONCACAF Champions Cup.

Squad

Transfers

In

 from  Real Madrid
 from  Bayern München
 from  Paris Saint-Germain
 from Puebla FC
 from Chivas Guadalajara
 from Club Leon
 from CF Monterrey
 from  Colo Colo (January)
 from  Ancona Calcio (January)

Out

 to  FC Porto
 to  Corinthians 
 to  Tecos UAG

Competitions

Liga MX

League table

Group 2

Matches

Quarterfinals

Semifinals

Concacaf Champions' Cup

Fourth round

Fifth round

Semifinals

Final

References

External links

Club América seasons
Liga MX seasons